Tinkershrimp & Dutch is a British animated children's television series created by Gregor Stevenson and Chris Stack, which premiered on Nicktoons UK's on-demand and online services on 15 January 2016.

Plot
A langoustine and slow loris (named Tinkershrimp and Dutch, respectively) work as bodyguards for a king.

Characters
Tinkershrimp (voiced by Darren Evans) is a witty Welsh langoustine and one of King Hunnybun's two bodyguards.
Dutch (voiced by John Boyega) is a loris with the ability to travel back in time.
King Hunnybun (voiced by Alex Lowe) is the ruler of "New Great Great Britain."
Ingrid (voiced by Katia Kvinge) is the pilot of King Hunnybun's mobile Double Decker Castle.
Michael the Fowl (voiced by Sam Riley) is a headless chicken and the primary antagonist of the series.

Series overview

Episodes
A single series consisting of five episodes has been announced. The series premiered with the episode "Time to Be Polite" on 15 January 2016 and ended with the episode "Time to Be Cool" on 12 February 2016.

Series 1 (2016)

External links
 
 Official site

References

Nickelodeon original programming
British children's television series
2010s British comedy television series
2016 British television series debuts
2016 British television series endings
English-language television shows